Zeichnungen des Patienten O. T. (or Drawings of Patient O. T.) is the second studio album by the Berlin-based musical group Einstürzende Neubauten. Some Bizzare Records released the album in 1983, and it was distributed in Germany by Rough Trade Deutschland. In the United States, PVC/Jem Records released the album in 1984 as Drawings of O. T.

The title refers to artist Oswald Tschirtner, an institutionalized schizophrenic who earned attention for his art. The original vinyl release of Zeichnungen des Patienten O. T. is Rough Trade Records #RTD 18 and Some Bizzare Records #SBVART 2.

Overview
The album shows a wider variety of moods and sounds than did the group's first album, Kollaps. Einstürzende Neubauten is famous for banging, scraping, plucking or otherwise wringing sounds from resonant objects. While such metallic clatter pervades the album, the group also uses techniques such as found sounds (telephone conversations, the Hamburg fish market) and (pre-digital) sampling; for example, a sample of the Armenian song "Toun en kelkhen imastoun yes" is used in "Armenia". Bass guitar is relatively prominent, though generally played in a minimal style (and perhaps contributing more toward sonic texture rather than forming a rhythmic or harmonic foundation). Trouser Press critic David Sheridan pointed out the group's drift toward conventionality, writing that "the title track even has a chord progression!"

"Armenia" was later used in the soundtrack of Michael Mann's 1995 film Heat and his 1999 film The Insider.

Track listing
 "Vanadium-I-Ching" – 4:54
 "Hospitalistische Kinder / Engel der Vernichtung" (Hospitalized Children/Angel of Destruction) – 5:09
 "Abfackeln!" (Flare Off!) – 3:32
 "Neun Arme" (Nine Arms) – 2:34
 "Herde" (Herds) – 1:24
 "Merle (Die Elektrik)" (Merle (Electricity)) – 2:20
 "Zeichnungen des Patienten O.T." (Drawings of Patient O.T.) – 3:23
 "Finger und Zähne" (Fingers and Teeth) – 0:09
 "Falschgeld" (Counterfeit Money) – 2:42
 "Styropor" (Polystyrene) - 2:24
 "Armenia" – 4:57
 "Die Genaue Zeit" (The Exact Time) – 7:06

Additional tracks
Some configurations (various cassette and compact disc versions) append one or more of the following tracks:
 "Der Herrscher und der Sieger" (The Ruler and the Winner) – 3:32 (live recording)
 "Affenroulette" (Ape Roulette)– 2:59 (live recording)
 "Durstiges Tier" (Thirsty Animal) – 6:28 (1982 single)
 "DNS-Wasserturm" (DNA-Watertower) – 6:27

The American vinyl release in 1984 included an EP comprising all four of these tracks.

Personnel
Einstürzende Neubauten
 Blixa Bargeld – lead vocals, guitars, misc.
 Mark Chung – bass, backing vocals, misc.
 N.U. Unruh – percussion, backing vocals, misc.
 F.M. Einheit – percussion, backing vocals, misc.
 Alexander Hacke – tapes, percussion, "thirsty animal", misc.

Technical
 Jon Caffery – engineer
 Beate Bartel – bass on "Falschgeld"

References

 Einstürzende Neubauten. Liner notes. Zeichnungen des Patienten O. T. Some Bizzare SBVART CD 002, 1983.
 Zakarian, K. "Toun en Kelkhen Imastoun Yes". Armenie – Musique de tradition populaire et des Achough. Ocora C 580005, 1993.

Einstürzende Neubauten albums
1983 albums
Some Bizzare Records albums